The national flag of Nepal is the world's only non-rectangular flag that acts as both the state flag and civil flag of a sovereign country. The flag is a simplified combination of two single pennons (or pennants), known as a double-pennon. Its crimson red is the symbol of bravery and it also represents the color of the rhododendron, Nepal's national flower, while the blue border is the color of peace. Until 1962, the flag's emblems, both the sun and the crescent moon, had human faces, but they were removed to modernize the flag.

The current flag was adopted on 16 December 1962, along with the formation of a new constitutional government.  Shankar Nath Rimal, a civil engineer, standardised the flag on the request of King Mahendra. It borrows from the original, traditional design, used throughout the 19th and 20th centuries, and is a combination of the two individual pennons used by rival branches of the ruling dynasty.

History

Historically, triangular shape of the flag in the south Asian region was very common since it was compact in size so the flag furled even with the lowest wind, thus making it visible over long distances. The traces of triangular flags could be found in Hinduism. The flag's history is vague and there are no specific accounts of its creator. Nepal has historically used both quadrilateral flag as well as non quadrilateral flag throughout its history.

The flags of almost all states in South Asia were triangular. A French book about Nepal from 1928 shows a double pennant flag with a green border rather than blue like today. There are other forms of pennant type flags, mostly used in Hindu and Buddhist temples around Nepal. Many accounts date the creation of the double-pennant  to  King Prithvi Narayan Shah. The flag of the ancient Gorkha kingdom started off as a single  triangular War banner of the Shah kings with red colour and various deities and other symbols as symbols in the flag. After Prithvi Narayan Shah unified all small principalities of Nepal, the double-pennon flag began to be the standard flag. According to some historians, the Rana ruler Jung Bahadur changed the symbols of sun and moon into faces of the sun and moon symbolizing the kings as the Rajputs of Lunar dynasty and the Rana themselves as the Rajputs of the Solar dynasty.  Nepal has simply maintained its ancient tradition, while every other state has adopted a rectangular or square version in the European vexillological tradition.

The present flag of Nepal was adopted under the Nepalese constitution adopted on 16 December 1962. The modern flag seems to be the combination of ancient mustang kingdom and the ongoing flag used by the former Gorkha Kingdom. The colour gradients have been adopted from the Mustang Kingdom. Prior to 1962 both symbols on the flag, the sun and moon had human faces. The constitution dedicated an entire section to the precise size and shape of the flag since people were drawing it incorrectly. This section is continued even today even though multiple constitutions were introduced in the country during the period.

In May 2008 during the drafting of the new constitution, various political parties demanded the change of the flag since it symbolized Hinduism and monarchy but this proposal was rejected.

Symbolism

In modern times, the flag's symbolism has evolved to incorporate several meanings. The crimson red indicates the bravery of Nepali people and is the country's national color and the blue border represents peace and harmony. The colors are often found in Nepalese decoration and works of art. A theory is that the two points represented peace and hard work, using the symbols of the moon and sun respectively. Traditionally the flag of Nepal is derived from Hinduism which is common in Hindu cultures. However, the modern and government-sanctioned representation is of Hinduism and Buddhism, the main religions of the country.

The inclusion of the celestial bodies indicates Nepal's permanence and the hope that Nepal will enjoy the same longevity as the Sun and the Moon. The moon also symbolizes the cool weather of the Himalayas, whereas the sun symbolizes the heat and the high temperature of the southern lowlands (Terai). Additionally, the stylized moon represents the calm demeanor and purity of spirit of the Nepali people, while the stylized sun represents their fierce resolve.

Colour scheme

Flag layout

A precise geometrical description of the Nepalese national flag was specified in Article 5, Schedule 1 of the former constitution of the Kingdom of Nepal, adopted on 9 November 1990. Schedule 1 of the Constitution of Nepal, adopted on 20 September 2015, details a specific method of making the national flag of Nepal.

Aspect ratio
When constructed according to the stated geometric construction law, the ratio of the height of the flag to the longest width is an irrational number:
 ≈ 1:1.21901033….

This ratio is the least root of the quartic polynomial
and arises from the addition of the blue border after construction of the red field.  The bounding rectangle of the red field alone has the rational aspect ratio 3:4 (=1:1.333…).

Incorrect versions

Because of the Nepalese flag's unique proportions, its large-scale reproduction is difficult. It is sometimes overlaid on a white area to make the flag a 3:2 ratio; an example is the Nepalese flag used at some venues of the 2016 Summer Olympics where the flag design was placed on rectangular cloth the same shape as other flags at the Olympics, with the rest of the flag left white.

During a 2018 visit of the Indian Prime Minister Narendra Modi to Janakpur, a version of the flag with incorrect shape and geometrical proportions was flown by officials, causing outrage on social media and with national personnel.

See also

 List of flags of Nepal
 Emblem of Nepal
 Largest Human Flag of Nepal
 Timeline of Nepalese history

References

External links

Flag of Nepal

 Archived at Ghostarchive and the Wayback Machine: 
 Explore Nepal – Download Nepal Flag
 Amazing Facts about Flag of Nepal
 Nepal Flag – History, Meaning, Facts and More

 
National symbols of Nepal
Nepal
Nepal
Nepal